Christ Church, Mussoorie is a church in Mussoorie, Uttarakhand, India, that is considered to be the oldest church in the Himalayan region. It was erected in 1836 by the small British community that had made the town their home. Today, it is part of the Church of North India, which comprises the Anglican Communion. It is built in Gothic Revival style.

References

Churches in Uttarakhand
Church of North India church buildings
Mussoorie
Gothic Revival architecture in India